Adventures of a Plumber's Mate is a 1978 British sex comedy film directed by Stanley Long and starring Christopher Neil as Sid South. Following on from Adventures of a Taxi Driver and Adventures of a Private Eye, it was the final film of the series which attempted to occupy the same market position as the better-known and more successful Confessions series starring Robin Askwith.

Cast
 Christopher Neil as Sid South
 Arthur Mullard as Blackie
 Stephen Lewis as Crapper
 Anna Quayle as Loretta Proudfoot
 Willie Rushton as Dodger
 Nina West as Sally
 Prudence Drage as Janice
 Suzy Mandel as 1st Tennis Girl
 Christopher Biggins as Robin
 Elaine Paige as Susie (Named as Daisy in the credits)
 Leon Greene as Biggs
 Peter Cleall as Carson
 Richard Caldicot as Wallings
 Jonathan Adams as Rent Collector
 Claire Davenport as Belinda
 Jerold Wells as Stropper
 Derek Martin as Motorcycle Dealer

Anna Quayle and Willie Rushton appeared in the earlier Adventures of a Private Eye, but playing different characters. Although Stephen Lewis's character is given the name 'Crapper', he is in fact recreating his TV role of Inspector Blake from On The Buses.

References

Keeping the British End Up: Four Decades of Saucy Cinema by Simon Sheridan (Titan Books) (4th edition), 2011

External links
 

1978 films
British sex comedy films
1970s sex comedy films
1978 comedy films
1970s English-language films
Films directed by Stanley Long
1970s British films